Bycroft is a surname. Notable people with the surname include:

Chris Bycroft, English basketball player for John Carr Doncaster in the 1980–81 National Basketball League season
Christine Bycroft, New Zealand statistician and demographer
John Bycroft, player on the Macedonia national cricket team
Scott Bycroft, 2010 winner of the Australian National Photographic Portrait Prize
Syd Bycroft (1912–2004), English footballer and manager

See also
Kevin Bycroft Cup, an Australian rugby competition